Mohamed Said Al-Maskary (born 2 October 1973) is an Omani sprinter. He competed in the men's 4 × 100 metres relay at the 2000 Summer Olympics.

References

External links
 

1973 births
Living people
Athletes (track and field) at the 2000 Summer Olympics
Omani male sprinters
Olympic athletes of Oman
Place of birth missing (living people)
Athletes (track and field) at the 1998 Asian Games
Asian Games competitors for Oman